Eurofluvioviridavis is a genus of extinct primitive birds from Middle Eocene of the Messel Pit, Germany.

References

Eocene birds
Fossil taxa described in 2005
Fossils of Germany